This is a list of radio stations in Uruguay.

Artigas

89.5 - Viva FM 89.5 (CX208D) – Artigas – 
90.7 – Amatista FM (CX214) – Artigas
94.7 – Aquarius FM – Artigas (closed)
1180 AM - 6075 SW - La Voz de Artigas – Artigas

Canelones

AM
1570 -     Radio Canelones - Canelones
1600 -     Continental - Pando

FM
88.3  -    Lacosta FM - Barra de Carrasco
89.3  -    Del Molino FM - Pando
89.9  -    Atlántida FM - Atlántida
89.7  -    Viví FM - La Paz
90.1  -    FM Ideal – Santa Lucia
90.5  -    Santa Rosa FM - Santa Rosa
91.3  -    FM San Ramón - San Ramón
91.5  -    Señal ZOE - San José de Carrasco
92.3  -    Oro FM - El Pinar
93.1  -    Inolvidable FM – Las Piedras
100.7 -    UNO - Tala
102.9 -    Emisora Total - La Paz
104.9 -    Metrópolis FM - La Paz 
107.3 -    Radioluz - Canelones

Cerro Largo

AM
1520 –      Radio Acuarela – Melo
1470 –      Radio María – Melo
1340 –      La Voz de Melo – Melo
FM
99.1 –      Ciudad de Melo FM (La 99 FM) – Melo
98.3 -      Nova FM  - Melo
88.1 -      Ritmo FM - Melo
101.5 -     Integración FM - Aceguá
90.3 -      Aceguá FM - Aceguá
105.5 -     La Galena FM - Río Branco
89.5 -      Sirio FM - Fraile Muerto

Colonia
AM
550 –     Radio Colonia – Colonia
1590 -    Radio Real de San Carlos - Colonia

FM
90.7 –     Reflejos FM – Nueva Helvecia
91.9 –     Amanecer FM – Colonia

Florida

FM
90.9 –     La Noventa FM – Florida

Lavalleja

FM
99.1 –      Federal FM – Minas (pop, news)

Maldonado

AM
1210  -     Radio RBC – Piriápolis
FM
88.7  -     Milenium Punta - Punta del Este
89.5  -     Global FM - Maldonado
90.1  -     Radio Liceo N°1 - San Carlos
91.5  -     Brava FM - Maldonado
92.5  -     FM Cielo - Pan de Azúcar
93.5  -     Azul en el Este - Punta del Este
95.1  -     Concierto Punta - Maldonado
96.7  -     Viva FM – San Carlos
97.5  -     Radio Nuevo Tiempo - Punta del Este
98.9  -     Bohemia FM - Punta del Este
100.9 -     Babel - Maldonado
101.5 -     Radio Cero Punta - Punta del Este
102.5 -     M24 Maldonado - Maldonado
103.5 -     Aspen FM – Punta del Este
106.5 -     Cadena del Mar - Maldonado
107.1 -     FM Gente - Maldonado

Montevideo

AM
580 –     Clarín (CX58) – Montevideo (music)
610 –     Radio Rural (CX4) – Montevideo (news/folklore)
650 –     SODRE (CX6) – Montevideo (classical)
690 –     Radio Sarandi (CX8) – Montevideo (news/talk)
770 –     Radio Oriental (CX12) – Montevideo (news/sports/religious)
810 –     El Espectador (CX14) – Montevideo (news/talk)
850 –     Radio Carve (CX16) – Montevideo (news/talk/sports)
890 –     Sport 890 (CX18) – Montevideo (sports)
930 –     Radio Monte Carlo (CX20) – Montevideo (news/information)
970 –     Universal (CX22) – Montevideo (variety/soccer)
1010 –    Radio 1010 AM (CX24) – Montevideo (sports)
1050 –    Radio Uruguay (CX26) – Montevideo (news/variety/public)
1090 –    Radio María (CX28) – Montevideo (religious)
1130 –    Radio Nacional La 30 (CX30) – Montevideo (news/information)
1170 –    Radiomundo (CX32) – Montevideo (information/variety)
1250 –    Radio Centenario (CX36) – Montevideo (information)
1290 –    Emisora del Sur (CX38) – Montevideo (music/variety/public)
1330 –    Radio Fénix (CX40) – Montevideo (variety)
1370 –    Ciudad de Montevideo (CX42) – Montevideo (variety)
1410 –    AM Libre (CX44) – Montevideo (news/information/variety)
1450 –    Radio América (CX46) – Montevideo (religious/variety)
FM
90.3 –    FM Hit – Montevideo
91.1 –    Radio Futura FM – Montevideo
91.9 –    Radio Disney – Montevideo
92.5 –    Urbana - Montevideo
93.9 –    Océano FM – Montevideo
94.7 –    Emisora del Sur – Montevideo
95.5 –    Del Plata FM – Montevideo
96.3 –    Alfa FM – Montevideo
97.1 –    Babel FM – Montevideo
97.9 –    M24 – Montevideo
98.7 –    Diamante FM – Montevideo
99.5 –    FM del Sol – Montevideo
100.3 –   Aire FM – Montevideo
101.9 –   Azul FM – Montevideo
103.7 –   FM Latina – Montevideo
104.3 –   Radio Cero – Montevideo
105.3 –   FM del Carmen – Montevideo
105.9 –   Galaxia FM – Montevideo
106.7 –   La Ley 106.7 – Montevideo

Paysandu

FM
96.3 –      Casino FM – Paysandu
106.9 –      Contacto FM (CX295B) – Paysandu( CHR-pop)

Rivera

AM
1480 –     Radio Internacional (CW43B) – Rivera

Rocha

AM
1260 –      Difusora Rochense – Rocha
1590 –      CW 159 – Lascano
FM
91.3 –      La Marea – Rocha
98.3 –     Cadena dela Costa|rep. – Rocha
99.9 –      Imaginacion 99.9 – Rocha
102.1 –     Cadena dela Costa – La Paloma
106.3 -     Onda Marina - La Paloma

Salto

AM

560 -      Radio Turística - Salto
740 -      Radio Tabaré - Salto
1020 -     Radio Libertadores - Salto
1120 -     Radio Salto
1410 -     Radio 1410 - Salto
1450 –     Radio Arapey – Salto

FM
88.3 -      Del Lago FM - Salto
101.5 -     Siglo XXI 101.5 - Salto
103.3 -     America 103.3 – Salto

San Jose

FM
99.1 –      Café Noticias – San Jose de Mayo
103.3 –      Encuentro 103.3 – San Jose de Mayo

Tacuarembó

FM
92.5 25 kW  Armonia FM (CX223) – Tacuarembó
104.5 25 kW  Radio Gaucha (CX283) – Tacuarembó
101.7 25 kW

Treinta y Tres

FM
97.3 –     FM Conquistador – Treinta y Tres

References

External links
 Full List Uruguay Radio Stations updated 2013  Listen Online
 First Broadcasting Museum in Uruguay 
 Uruguayan radio stations live 
 Uruguay Radio 
 Uruguayan radio 
 Uruguayan online radio stations 
 Links to radios from Uruguay 
 Buró de Radios del Uruguay 

 
Uruguay
Radio stations in Uruguay